Ringgold High School is a 6–12 school in unincorporated Bienville Parish, Louisiana, United States, near Ringgold. It is a part of the Bienville Parish School Board. 

 the school had 253 students.

Athletics
Ringgold High athletics competes in the LHSAA.

References

External links
 Ringgold High School website
 Old Ringgold High School website

Public high schools in Louisiana
Public middle schools in Louisiana
Schools in Bienville Parish, Louisiana